Mar Lodge is a sporting lodge  to the west of Braemar and the principal building on the Mar Lodge Estate in Aberdeenshire, Scotland. It was built in 1895, replacing an earlier building, by Alexander Duff, 1st Duke of Fife.

Location

Mar Lodge is a sporting lodge built for the use of the Duke and Duchess of Fife.

History

There have been three buildings known as Mar Lodge. The first, originally known as Dalmore House, was built in the 18th century by William Duff, Baron Braco, close to the site of the present Lodge. Lord Braco had acquired the Dalmore estate some time between 1730 and 1737 from the Mackenzie lairds of Dalmore, and by the end of the 18th century the Duff family also owned the lands of Allanaquoich, Auchindryne and Inverey The building was damaged in the "Muckle Spate" ("great flood") of 1829, and later demolished.

Corriemulzie Cottage 
The 2nd Mar Lodge, colloquially known as Corriemulzie Cottage or 'New' Mar Lodge, was built near Linn of Corriemulzie at the top of Mar Lodge Brae. It was a very 'Victorian' building with architectural detailing such as prominent use of lattice work (still visible on the 'Stag Ballroom') and tree-trunk supports (visible in the veranda of the old bar at the rear of  Mar Lodge) being reused in the construction of the next Mar Lodge. It was destroyed by fire on the 14th of June 1895.

The present lodge 

The 3rd Mar Lodge was built between 1895 and 1898 for the Alexander Duff, 1st Duke of Fife and his wife Princess Louise, Princess Royal and Duchess of Fife. The foundation stone was laid by her grandmother Queen Victoria on 15 October 1895.

An old postcard shows the original veranda and drive alignment that allowed horse-drawn carriages arriving from Braemar to pull up at the main door.

The 3rd Mar Lodge was extensively damaged by a fire while being renovated in 1991, but was rebuilt. It was converted into holiday flats and retains many of the grand features of its heyday as a hunting lodge. The ballroom has 2,435 red deer stags heads lining the walls and ceiling.

Mar Lodge Estate became a National Trust for Scotland property in 1995.

Stag Ballroom
A ballroom was constructed for estate staff balls, required by the need for segregation between master and servant which dominated the period. Built near to the second Mar Lodge at Corriemulzie, it was moved to the present site in 1898. A large timber building in the estate red, it has distinctive lattice trellising, an original Victorian ventilation system and unusual cast iron bracers on stone plinths supporting the walls. Internally the building remains virtually in its original state and contains over 2,000 stags skulls.

St Ninian's Chapel

St Ninian's Chapel stands immediately adjacent to Mar Lodge and was originally the private chapel of the owners of Mar Lodge. The 1st Duke of Fife and his family are buried in the chapel.

Sources

See also
 Places, place names, and structures on Mar Lodge Estate

Footnotes

External links

Category B listed buildings in Aberdeenshire
Buildings and structures on Mar Lodge Estate
National Trust for Scotland properties
Hunting lodges in Scotland